Arcari is an Italian surname. Notable people with the surname include:

Antonio Arcari (born 1953), diplomat of the Holy See
Bruno Arcari (disambiguation), multiple people
Michele Arcari (born 1978), Italian footballer
Pietro Arcari (1909–1988), Italian footballer

Italian-language surnames